Kent Island, New Brunswick, Canada is an island located near Grand Manan Island off the coast of New Brunswick. It is the site of the Bowdoin Scientific Research Station, which is mainly involved in bird and nature research. The island was donated to Bowdoin College in 1936 by John Sterling Rockefeller.

See also 
 List of communities in New Brunswick
 List of islands of New Brunswick

References 

Coastal islands of New Brunswick
Landforms of Charlotte County, New Brunswick